was a professional 7 dan Go player.

Biography
Onoda was a member of the Hoensha teaching group established by Honinbo Shuho, which ran from 1879 until the founding of the Nihon Ki-in. In addition, he was one of five players to form the Hiseikai, a group tournament consisting also of Dohei Takabe, Kensaku Segoe, Tamejiro Suzuki and Karigane Junichi.

Although he joined the Nihon Ki-in when it was established in 1924, Onoda broke away to help form the Kiseisha. However, he soon became disillusioned and, along with Suzuki and Kato Shin, returned to the Nihon Ki-in in 1928.

Onoda was promoted to 7 dan after defeating Minoru Kitani, also a 7 dan at the time, in May 1939.

Notes

Japanese Go players
1896 births
1944 deaths